lya Arkadievich Kazakov; August 3, 1972, Kaliningrad, Moscow Oblast) is a Russian football commentator, TV presenter, journalist, author and former press attaché of the Russian national football team (2005-2015).  He was the Ambassador for 2018 FIFA World Cup host city Saransk.

Biography 
In 1989-1996 he studied at the Faculty of Energy Physics of Moscow Power Engineering Institute. In February 1996 he graduated from the Moscow Power Engineering Institute with a degree in thermal engineering, worked for six months in the specialty in RKK Energia.

On television, Ilya Kazakov came in 1996 after winning the first competition of sports commentators, announced by the television channel NTV-Plus. Since  December 2001 to June 2003 he worked on the sports TV channel Seven TV, where he conducted weekly broadcasts about the Russian Championship.

In June 2003, Ilya Kazakov switched to the newly opened sports TV channel VGTRK  Sport (since 2010 it became the television channel Russia-2). Here he conducted the program   Football of Russia, commented on various football matches. Commented on the matches of the World and European Championships in 2004 (from Portugal), 2006 (from Germany), 2008 (from   Austria and Switzerland), 2010 (from South Africa) and 2016 (from France). He worked on the broadcasts of the championships of Russia and England, as well as matches of European soccer championships  the Champions League and the UEFA Cup.

In 2005 he commentateded on all the matches of CSKA in the winning UEFA Cup, including the final from Lisbon. He conducted live coverage of the election of organizers of the World Cups in football in 2018 and 2022 and many similar ceremonies of FIFA and UEFA.

In addition to football, he covered skiing at the 2010 Olympics and the 2011 World Hockey Championship.

From September 2015 to present —  adviser to the President of the Handball Federation of Russia
.

Since November 2016 hosts the updated version of the program  Football of Russia  on the TV channel Russia-24, alternately with Vladimir Stognienko.

Personal life 
Wife Maria. He is friends with Valery Nepomnyashchy. He is in pain for the Shakhtar Donetsk.

Books
 2008 —  This Team, or the Hiddink Phenomenon  
 2015 —  Foot'Ball People
 2017 —  Girl Behind Back 

References

External links
 

Russian journalists
Russian sports journalists
Writers from Moscow
1972 births
Living people
Russian association football commentators
People from Korolyov, Moscow Oblast
Russian columnists